The Khurnak Fort is a ruined fort on the  northern shore of the Pangong Lake that spans eastern Ladakh in India and Rutog County in the Tibet region of China. The area of the Khurnak Fort is disputed by India and China, and has been under Chinese administration since 1958.

Though the ruined fort itself is not of much significance, it serves as a landmark denoting the middle of the Pangong Lake. The fort lies at the western edge of a large plain formed as the alluvial fan of a stream known as Chumesang, which falls into the Pangong lake from the north. The plain itself is called Ote Plain locally, but now generally called the Khurnak Plain.it is historical part of India but annexed by China after Indo-china war.It is part of Indian peninsula politically and geographically.

Geography 

The Khurnak Fort stands on a large plain called Ot or Ote at the centre of the Pangong Lake on its northern bank. In recent times, the plain has come to be called the "Khurnak Plain", after the fort. The plain divides the Pangong Lake into two halves: to the west is the Pangong Tso proper and to the east are a string of lakes called Nyak Tso, Tso Ngombo or other names.

The Khurnak plain is 8 miles long and 3 miles wide. It is, in fact, the mouth of a valley called Chang Parma (meaning "northern middle", also called  "Chang Barma", later "Changlung Lungpa"). The Chumesang stream that flows through the valley—about 40 to 50 miles long—brings down waters from numerous glaciers lying between the Pangong Lake and the Chang Chenmo Valley. The plain is formed by the alluvial deposits of the stream encroaching into the bed of the lake.
The growth of the plain over the millennia has reduced the lake in its vicinity to a narrow channel "like a large river" for about 2–3 miles, with a minimum breadth of 50 yards. The constrained flow of water from east to west makes the lower lake to the west (Pangong Tso) considerably more saline than the eastern lake (Tso Ngombo).

The top of the Chang Parma valley is marked by a grazing ground called Dambu Guru. Here, the valley branches into two valleys, one going northwest to the Marsimik La pass and the  other going northeast to the grazing ground of Mipal (or Migpal/Mitpal). Mipal is connected via mountain passes to both the Chang Chenmo Valley in the northwest and the well-watered village of Noh in the southeast.

H. H. Godwin-Austen noted in 1867 that all of Ote Plain had considerable growth of grass and formed a winter grazing area for the Changpa nomads. The snow never stayed for long on the Ote Plain, even when the lake itself froze. The Changpa nomads of Noh (also called Üchang or Wujiang) and Rudok camped out at the plain during the winter. To protect the tents against the wind, walls of stone and earth were built, and the floors were dug 3 feet deep.  Strachey also labels the Khurnak Plain as "Uchang Tobo" which might indicate a connection with village of Noh.

Access 
The Khurnak Plain is accessible from both Ladakh and Rudok via multiple routes. Strachey noted two access routes from Ladakh, one via Marsimik La and the other via the Chang Chenmo valley and Mipal. These were usable in the summer. A third route from the south, crossing the narrow channel of the lake, shown in later maps as a ford, would have been the easiest route to the Khurnak Plain. (Map 3) The ability to ford the lake here was found erroneous in later British testimonies.

From the Tibetan side, a route along the northern shore of the Pangong Lake was available. Sven Hedin witnessed it being used as a trade route by Ladakhi traders going to Rudok.
The route was difficult to traverse in parts because of cliffs jutting into the lake. However, this was no impediment in winter when the lake froze.
In addition, a longer route from Noh via Mipal was also available. (Map 3)

Khurnak Fort 
Godwin-Austen mentioned the Khurnak Fort, whose ruins stood on a low rock (elevation: 4,257 m) on the northwestern side of the plain. Judging from its site, he believed that it belonged to Tibetans who presumably built it "years ago". But its proximity to Leh and the strength of its Thanadar (governor), he thought, placed it in Kashmiri territory. The Khurnak Plain was a "disputed ground", according to Godwin-Austen, which was claimed by the Ladakhis as well as the Tibetans of Rudok.

Evidently the purpose of the fort was to guard against Ladakhis crossing to the Khurnak Plain from the south, crossing the narrow channel of the lake. Such activity was witnessed during the times of British Raj as well. The Khurnak Plain, being a prized winter pasture ground, was the preserve of the shepherds from Noh, the only permanently inhabited place on the north shore of Pangong Lake. Ladakhis, who lived south of the Pangong Lake, had their winter pastures in Skakjung, much further to the south.

History 

In 1863, British topographer Henry Haversham Godwin-Austen described Khurnak as a disputed plain claimed both by inhabitants of the Panggong district and Tibetan authorities from Lhasa. He personally believed that it should belong to the latter due to the "old fort standing on a low rock on the north-western side of the plain" previously built by the Tibetans. Godwin-Austen remarked that the Kashmiri authorities in Leh had recently exerted their influence in the region such that Khurnak was effectively controlled by the Maharaja of Jammu and Kashmir.

According to Alastair Lamb, the majority of British maps published between 1918 and 1947 showed Khurnak as being in Tibet.

Sino-Indian border dispute
Prior to 1958, the boundary between India and China was considered to be at the Khurnak Fort and Indian forces visited it from time to time and had a post there. China wrested its control since around July 1958, according to most sources.

During the 1960 talks between the two governments on the boundary issue, India submitted official records including the 1908 Settlement Report, which recorded the amount of revenue collected at Khurnak, as proof of jurisdiction over Khurnak. The Chinese claim line of 1956 did not include the Khurnak Fort, but the 1960 claim line included the Khurnak Fort.

In 1963, Khurnak Fort was described by the US National Photographic Interpretation Center as follows:

As of 2019, a PLA border patrol company of the Western Theater Command is stationed nearby.

See also 
 List of locations in Aksai Chin

Notes

References

Bibliography

External links 
 

Forts in Tibet
Pangong Lake
Borders of Ladakh
Rutog County